The Serbs of Vojvodina are the largest ethnic group in this northern province of Serbia. For centuries, Vojvodina was ruled by several European powers, but Vojvodina Serbs never assimilated into cultures of those countries. Thus, they have consistently been a recognized indigenous ethnic minority with its own culture, language and religion. According to the 2011 census, there were 1,289,635 Serbs in Vojvodina or 66.76% of the population of the province.

History

Early medieval period
Before the Roman conquest in the 1st century BC, Celtic tribes inhabited the territory of present-day Vojvodina region. During the Roman rule, the original inhabitants were heavily Romanized.

The Slavs (Severans, Abodrites, Braničevci and Timočani) settled today's Vojvodina during the early medieval migrations. Until the 13th century, the region had a dominant West Slavic and Hungarian population.

In the 9th century the region of present-day Vojvodina was ruled by the two local Bulgaro-Slavic dukes (Voivodes). Their names were Salan and Glad. Salan ruled the territory of Bačka, and his capital city was Titel, while Glad ruled the territory of Banat. The descendant of Glad was Ahtum, another local duke of Banat, the last ruler who opposed to the establishment of the Kingdom of Hungary in the 11th century. The important local Bulgaro-Slavic duke was also Sermon, a vassal of the Bulgarian emperor Samuil, who ruled over Srem in the 11th century.

Hungarian rule

Parts of Vojvodina were conquered by the Kingdom of Hungary between the 10th and 12th centuries. This was followed by the destruction of the local Slavic tribal organization and introduction of the county system of rule. The first known prefect of the Bač county (in the region of Bačka) was recorded in 1074 and his name was Vid, which is a Slavic name by origin. During the rule of the Hungarian king Coloman (1095–1116), the local Serb nobles in Bačka were Uroš, Vukan and Pavle. A record from 1309 speak about "Schismatics" (Eastern Orthodox Christians), who lived in Bačka. Arsenije I Bogdanović from Srem, the second Serb archbishop (1233–1263) after Saint Sava, was born in Srem, in the village Dabar near Slankamen. After the creation of an autocephalous Serbian Orthodox Church in 1219 and negotiations between Archbishop Sava and the Hungarian crown, the Eastern Orthodox Slavic population north of the Danube was subjected under its jurisdiction.

From 1282 to 1316 Serbian King Stefan Dragutin Nemanjić reigned several lands as a "King of Syrmia". The center of his realm was in "Lower Syrmia" (modern Mačva), while he also possibly ruled "Upper Syrmia" (i.e. Syrmian part of Vojvodina). Stefan Dragutin died in 1316, and was succeeded by his son Vladislav (1316–1325), who was a vassal of the Hungarian King.

An increasing number of Serbs began settling in the Vojvodina region from the 14th century onward. By 1483, according to a Hungarian source, as much as half of the population of the Vojvodina territory of the Kingdom of Hungary at the time consisted of Serbs. The Hungarian kings encouraged the immigration of Serbs to the Kingdom, and hired many of them as soldiers and border guards. A letter of King Matthias from 12 January 1483 mentions that 200,000 Serbs had settled the Hungarian kingdom in the last four years. Despot Vuk and his warriors were greatly rewarded with estates, also including places in Croatia. Also, by this time, the Jakšić family had become increasingly notable, and held estates stretching over several counties in the kingdom. The territory of Vuk Grgurević (1471–85), the Serbian Despot in Hungarian service (as "Despot of the Kingdom of Rascia"), was called "Little Rascia".

After the Ottoman Empire conquered Serbian Despotate (in 1459), Serbian titular despots ruled in parts of Vojvodina as vassals of the Hungarian crown. The residence of the despots was Kupinik (today Kupinovo) in Srem. The Serbian despots were: Vuk Grgurević (1471–1485), Đorđe Branković (1486–1496), Jovan Branković (1496–1502), Ivaniš Berislav (1504–1514), Stevan Berislav (1520–1535), Radič Božić (1527–1528), Pavle Bakić (1537) and Stefan Štiljanović (1537–1540). The last three did not rule in the territory of present-day Vojvodina, but had possessions in the territories of present-day Romania, Hungary and Croatia. The fact that Despots of Serbia ruled in the territory of present-day Vojvodina, but also the presence of large Serb population, are reasons because of which in many historical records and maps made between 15th and 18th centuries, territory of present-day Vojvodina was named Rascia (Raška, Serbia) and Little Raška (Little Serbia).

A 1542 document describes that "Serbia" stretched from Lipova and Timișoara to the Danube, while a 1543 document that Timișoara and Arad being located "in the middle of Rascian land" (in medio Rascianorum). At that time, the majority language in the region between Mureș and Körös was indeed Serbian. Apart from Serbian being the main language of the Banat population, there were 17 Serbian monasteries active in Banat at that time. The territory of Banat had received a Serbian character and was called "Little Rascia".

Ottoman rule

The Ottoman Empire took control of Vojvodina following the Battle of Mohács of 1526 and the conquest of Banat in 1552. Soon after the Battle of Mohač, Jovan Nenad, a leader of the Serb mercenaries, established his rule in Bačka, northern Banat and a small part of Srem. He created an ephemeral independent state, with Subotica as its capital. At the pitch of his power, Jovan Nenad proclaimed himself "Serbian Emperor" in Subotica. Taking advantage of the extremely confused military and political situation, the Hungarian noblemen from the region joined forces against him and defeated the Serbian troops in the summer of 1527. "Emperor" Jovan Nenad was assassinated and his state collapsed.

After the assassination of Jovan Nenad, the general commander of his army, Radoslav Čelnik, moved with part of the former emperor's army from Bačka to Srem, and acceded into the Ottoman service. Radoslav Čelnik then ruled over Srem as Ottoman vassal and took for himself the title of the duke of Srem, while his residence was in Slankamen.

The establishment of the Ottoman rule caused a massive depopulation of the Vojvodina region. Most of the Hungarians and many local Serbs fled from the region and escaped to the north. The majority of those who left in the region were Serbs, mainly now engaging either in farming either in Ottoman military service.

Under Ottoman policy, many Serbs were newly settled in the region. During the Ottoman rule, most of the inhabitants of the Vojvodina region were Serbs. In that time, villages were mostly populated with Serbs, while cities were populated with Muslims and Serbs. In 1594 Serbs in Banat started a large uprising opposing Turkish rule. This was one of three largest Serbian uprisings in history, and the largest one before the First Serbian Uprising led by Karađorđe.

Habsburg rule

The Habsburg monarchy took control of Vojvodina among other lands by the treaties of Karlovci (1699) and Požarevac (1718). The Serbian patriarch, Arsenije III Čarnojević, fearing the revenge of the Turks, immigrated in the last decade of the 17th century to the Habsburg monarchy with as many as 36,000 families, but these Serbs mostly went further to the north and settled in the territory of what is now Republic of Hungary with only small part of them settling in the territory of present-day north-western Vojvodina. However, because of this event, the Habsburg Emperor promised religious freedom to all Serbs in the Monarchy as well as the right to elect their own "vojvoda" (military and civil governor). Much of the area of present-day Vojvodina where Serbs lived was incorporated into the Military Frontier. The emperor also recognized Serbs as one of the official nations of the Habsburg monarchy and he recognized the right of Serbs to have territorial autonomy within one separate voivodeship. This right, however, was not realized before the revolution in 1848–1849. The immigration of Serbs to the Habsburg monarchy was maintained during the 18th century.

During the Kuruc War (1703–1711) of Francis II Rakoczi, the territory of present-day Vojvodina was a battlefield between Hungarian rebels and local Serbs who fought on the side of the Habsburg Emperor. Serbs in Bačka suffered the greatest losses. Hungarian rebels burned Serb villages and many Serbs were expelled from Bačka. Darvas, the prime military commander of the Hungarian rebels, which fought against Serbs in Bačka, wrote: "We burned all large places of Rascia, on the both banks of the rivers Danube and Tisa".

During the Austrian rule many non-Serbs also settled in the territory of present-day Vojvodina. They were mainly (Catholic) Germans and Hungarians, but also Ruthenians, Slovaks, Czechs,
Poles, Romanians, and others. Because of this immigration, Vojvodina became one of the most ethnically diverse regions of Europe. However, there was also some emigration of Serbs from Vojvodina: after the Tisa-Moriš section of the Military Frontier was abolished, Serbs from the north-eastern parts of Bačka left this region and immigrated to Russia (notably to New Serbia and Slavo-Serbia) in 1752, and this region was then populated with new Hungarian settlers. Serbs, however, remained the single largest ethnic group in Vojvodina, until the second half of 20th century, when they became the absolute majority.

Between the 16th and 19th centuries, Vojvodina was a cultural centre of the Serb people. Especially important cultural centres were: Novi Sad, Sremski Karlovci, and the monasteries of Fruška Gora. In the first half of the 19th century, Novi Sad was the largest Serb city; in 1820 this city had about 20,000 inhabitants, of whom 2/3 were Serbs. The Matica Srpska moved to Novi Sad from Budapest in 1864. The Serbian gymnasiums of Novi Sad and Sremski Karlovci were at the time considered to be among the best in the Habsburg Kingdom of Hungary. Novi Sad was being called the "Serb Athens".

During the Revolutions of 1848, the Hungarians demanded national rights and autonomy within the Austrian Empire. However, they did not recognized the national rights of other peoples which lived in the Habsburg Kingdom of Hungary in that time. Wishing to express their national individuality and confronted with the new Hungarian authorities, Serbs declared the constitution of the Serbian Voivodship (Serbian Duchy) at the May Assembly in Sremski Karlovci (May 13–15, 1848). The Serbian Voivodship consisted of Srem, Bačka, Banat, and Baranja regions. The Serbs also formed a political alliance with the Croats "based on freedom and perfect equality". They also recognized the Romanian nationality. The metropolitan of Sremski Karlovci, Josif Rajačić, was elected patriarch, while Stevan Šupljikac the first Voivode (duke). A National committee was formed as the new government of the Serbian Voivodship. Instead of the old feudal regime a new reign was founded based on the national boards with the Head Serbian National Board presiding.

The Hungarian government replied by the use of force: on June 12, 1848, a war between Serbs and Hungarians started. Austria took the side of Hungary at first, demanding from the Serbs to "go back to being obedient". Serbs were aided by volunteers from autonomous Ottoman Principality of Serbia. A consequence of this war, was the expansion of the conservative factions. Since the Austrian court turned against the Hungarians in the later stage of revolution, the feudal and clerical circles of Serbian Voivodship formed an alliance with Austria and became a tool of the Viennese government. Serbian troops from the Voivodship then joined the Habsburg army and helped in crushing the revolution in the Kingdom of Hungary.

After the defeat of the Hungarian revolution, by a decision of the Austrian emperor, in November 1849, an Austrian crown land known as the Voivodship of Serbia and Tamiš Banat was formed as the political successor of the Serbian Voivodship. The crown land consisted of the parts of Banat, Bačka and Srem regions. An Austrian governor seated in Temišvar ruled the area, and the title of voivod (duke) belonged to the emperor himself. The full title of the emperor was "Grand Voivod of the Voivodship of Serbia" (German: Großwoiwode der Woiwodschaft Serbien). Even after this crown land was abolished, the emperor kept this title until the end of the Habsburg monarchy in 1918.

In 1860 the Voivodship of Serbia and Tamiš Banat was abolished and most of its territory (Banat and Bačka) was incorporated into the Habsburg Kingdom of Hungary, although direct Hungarian rule began only in 1867, when the Kingdom of Hungary gained autonomy within the newly formed Austria-Hungary. Unlike Banat and Bačka, the Srem region was in 1860 incorporated into the Kingdom of Slavonia, another separate Habsburg crown land. However, the Kingdom of Slavonia was too incorporated into the Kingdom of Hungary in 1868.

After the Voivodship was abolished, one Serb politician, Svetozar Miletić, appeared in the political sphere. He demanded national rights for Serbs and other non-Hungarian peoples of the Kingdom of Hungary, but he was arrested and imprisoned because of his political demands. In 1867, the Austrian Empire was transformed into Austria-Hungary, with the Kingdom of Hungary becoming one of two autonomous parts of the new state. This was followed by a policy of Hungarization of the non-Hungarian nationalities, most notably promotion of the Hungarian language and suppression of Slavic languages (including Serbian).

The franchise was greatly restricted so as to keep power in the hands of the Hungarians. The new government of the autonomous Kingdom of Hungary, took the stance that the Kingdom of Hungary should be a Hungarian nation state, and that all other peoples living in the Kingdom: Germans, Jews, Romanians, Poles, Slovaks, Ruthenes, Serbs, and others should be assimilated. Finally, the privileges given to Serbs by the Habsburg emperor in 1690, were abolished in 1912.

Yugoslavia and Serbia
See also: Banat, Bačka and Baranja, Kingdom of Serbia, Treaty of Trianon, Kingdom of Serbs, Croats and Slovenes, Danube Banovina, Occupation of Vojvodina, 1941–1944, Banat, 1941-1944, Hungarian occupation of Baranja and Bačka, 1941–1944, 1942 raid in Novi Sad, Autonomous Province of Vojvodina (1945–1963), SAP Vojvodina

At the end of World War I, the Austro-Hungarian Empire collapsed, and the Serbs in Vojvodina gained another opportunity to achieve their political demands. On November 25, 1918, the Assembly of Serbs, Bunjevci, and other nations of Vojvodina in Novi Sad proclaimed the unification of Vojvodina (Banat, Bačka, and Baranja) with the Kingdom of Serbia. One day before this, on November 24, the Assembly of Srem also proclaimed the unification of Srem with Serbia. On December 1, 1918, the Vojvodina region became part of the Kingdom of Serbs, Croats and Slovenes. After the several centuries of living under foreign rule (Hungarian, Ottoman, Habsburg), the Vojvodinian Serbs now lived in a country together with other Serbs and South Slavs. That marked a new stage in the national development of the Serb people in the Vojvodina region.

The difficult time period for the Serbs in Vojvodina was a World War II and the Axis occupation (1941–1944), when Vojvodina region was held by the German, Hungarian and Croatian occupational forces. The occupying powers committed numerous crimes against the ethnic Serb population in the region. It is estimated that during the occupation, about 50,000 people in Vojvodina (mostly Serbs, Jews and Roma) were murdered, while more than 280,000 people were interned, arrested, violated or tortured.

The Axis occupation ended in 1944 and the autonomous province of Vojvodina (incorporating Srem, Banat and Bačka) was formed within Yugoslavia in 1945 as a part of Serbia. The province was created as a territorial autonomy for all peoples who live in it, with the significant role of the Serbs, who were ethnic majority in the province.

Demographics

Culture

 Matica Srpska, the oldest cultural-scientific institution of Serbs. It was founded in 1826 in Budapest and moved to Novi Sad in 1864.
 Serbian National Theatre, the oldest professional theatre among Serbs and South Slavs. It was founded in 1861 in Novi Sad.
 Normal School in Sombor, the oldest Serb normal school and the oldest normal school in this part of Europe, founded in 1778.
 Sremski Karlovci Gymnasium, the oldest Serb gymnasium. It was founded in 1791 in Sremski Karlovci.
 Sremski Karlovci Orthodox Seminary, the second oldest Eastern Orthodox seminary in the World (After the Spiritual Academy in Kiev). It was founded in 1794 in Sremski Karlovci.
 The first Serb elementary school was founded in Bečej in 1703.
 The first modern Serb printing-house was founded in Kikinda in 1878.
 The first Serb library was opened in Kikinda in 1879.
 The first Serb bookshop was opened in Novi Sad in 1790.
 The first Serb church singing society was founded in Pančevo in 1838.

Serb monasteries in Srem
There are as many as eighteen Serbian Orthodox monasteries located in the Srem region. Most of them are located on Fruška Gora mountain, except the Fenek and Zemun monasteries, which are located in the part of Srem that belongs to Belgrade, but historically this area too belonged to Vojvodina. According to the historical data, these monastery communities were historically recorded since the first decades of the 16th century, but the legends relate their founding to the period between the 12th and 15th centuries. In the course of centuries of their existence, these monasteries sustained the spiritual and political life of the Serbian nation. Here is the list of monasteries:

Beočin – The time of founding is unknown. It is first mentioned in Turkish records dated in 1566/1567.
Bešenovo – According to the legend, the monastery of Bešenovo was founded by Serbian king Dragutin at the end of the 13th century. The earliest historical records about the Monastery are dated in 1545.
Velika Remeta – Traditionally, its founding is linked to the king Dragutin. The earliest historical records about the Monastery are dated in 1562.
Vrdnik-Ravanica – The exact time of its founding is unknown. The records indicate that the church was built during the time of Metropolitan Serafim, in the second half of the 16th century.
Grgeteg – According to tradition the monastery was founded by Zmaj Ognjeni Vuk (despot Vuk Grgurević), in 1471. The earliest historical records about the Monastery are dated in 1545/1546.
Divša – It is believed to have been founded by despot Jovan Branković in the late 15th century. The earliest historical records about the Monastery are dated in the second half of the 16th century.
Jazak – The monastery was founded in 1736.
Krušedol – The monastery was founded between 1509 and 1516, by bishop Maksim (despot Đorđe Branković) and his mother Angelina.
Kuveždin – Traditionally, its foundation is ascribed to Stefan Štiljanović. The first reliable records of it are dated in 1566/1569.
Mala Remeta – The foundation is traditionally ascribed to the Serbian king Dragutin. The earliest historical records about the Monastery are dated in the middle of the 16th century.
Novo Hopovo – According to tradition, the monastery was built by the Despots of the Branković family. The first reliable mention of monastery is dated in 1641.
Privina Glava – According to the legends, Privina Glava was founded by a man named Priva, in the 12th century. The earliest historical records about the Monastery are dated in 1566/1567.
Petkovica – According to the tradition, founded by the widow of Stefan Štiljanović, despotess Jelena. The earliest historical records about the Monastery are dated in 1566/1567.
Rakovac – According to a legend written in 1704, Rakovac is the heritage of a certain man, Raka, courtier of despot Jovan Branković. The legend states that Raka erected the monastery in 1498. The earliest historical records about the Monastery are dated in 1545/1546.
Staro Hopovo – According to the tradition, the monastery was founded by bishop Maksim (despot Đorđe Branković). The reliable data about the monastery date back to 1545/1546.
Šišatovac – The foundation of the Monastery is ascribed to the refugee monks from the Serbian monastery of Žiča. The reliable facts illustrating the life of the monastery date back from the mid 16th century.
Fenek – According to tradition, the founders of Monastery were Stefan and Angelina Branković, in the second half of the 15th century. The earliest historical records about the Monastery are dated in 1563.
Zemun monastery in Zemun municipality. It was founded in 1786.

Serb monasteries in Bačka
Kovilj monastery in Novi Sad municipality. The monastery was reconstructed in 1705–1707. According to the legend, the monastery of Kovilj was founded by the first Serb archbishop Saint Sava in the 13th century.
Bođani monastery in Bač municipality. It was founded in 1478.
Sombor monastery in Sombor municipality. It was founded in 1928–1933.
In the outset of the 18th century there was a Serb monastery in Bački Monoštor near Sombor.

Serb monasteries in Banat
Mesić monastery in Vršac municipality. It was founded in the 15th century.
Vojlovica monastery in Pančevo municipality. It was founded during the time of despot Stefan Lazarević (1374–1427).
Holy Trinity monastery in Kikinda. It was built in 1885–87 as a foundation of Melanija Nikolić-Gajčić.
Saint Melanija monastery in Zrenjanin. It was founded in 1935 by Banatian bishop dr. Georgije Letić.
Bavanište monastery in Kovin municipality. It was founded in the 15th century and was destroyed in 1716. It was rebuilt in 1858.
Središte monastery in Vršac municipality. It was founded by despot Jovan Branković in the end of the 15th century.
Hajdučica monastery in Plandište municipality. It was founded in 1939.

Images

Notable people

Medieval period
 Arsenije I Bogdanović from Srem, the second Serb archbishop (1233–1263), after Saint Sava. He was born in Srem, in the village Dabar near Slankamen.
 Vuk Grgurević (Zmaj Ognjeni Vuk), Serbian despot (1471–1485).
 Đorđe Branković, Serbian despot (1486–1496).
 Jovan Branković, Serbian despot (1496–1502).
 Jovan Nenad (?-1527), a self-proclaimed "emperor", ruler of Bačka, northern Banat and a part of Srem from 1526 to 1527. He was born in town Lipova in northern Banat (today in Romania).
 Radič Božić, Serbian despot (1527–1528).
 Radoslav Čelnik, duke of Srem (1527–1530).
 Pavle Bakić, Serbian despot (1537).
 Stefan Štiljanović, Serbian despot (1537–1540).

Modern period
Politics and military:
 Jovan Monasterlija, vice-duke of Serbs (1691–1706).
 Sava Tekelija (1761–1842), politician and public worker. He was born in Arad.
 Josif Rajačić (1785–1861), the metropolitan of Sremski Karlovci, Serbian patriarch and administrator of Serbian Vojvodina.
 Stevan Šupljikac (1786–1848), the first duke of Serbian Vojvodina.
 Jovan Damjanić (Hungarian: János Damjanich, 1804–1849), a Hungarian general of Serbian origin.
 Jovan Subotić (1817–1886), politician and literate. He was born in village Dobrinci near Ruma.
 Svetozar Miletić (1826–1901), advocate, politician, mayor of Novi Sad, the political leader of Serbs in Vojvodina. He was born in the village Mošorin in Šajkaška.
 Jaša Tomić (1856–1922), publicist and politician. He lived in Novi Sad.
 Slobodan Jovanović (1869–1958), a prime minister of the Yugoslav government in exile during World War II, jurist and historian. He was born in Novi Sad.
 Dimitrije Stojaković (Hungarian: Döme Sztójay, 1883–1946), a Hungarian soldier and diplomat of Serbian origin, who served as Prime Minister of Hungary during World War II.

Culture, science and sports:
 Miroslav Antić (1932–1986), a Serbian poet. He was born in village Mokrin near Kikinda.
 Isidor Bajić (1878–1915), a composer. He was born in Kula and he lived in Novi Sad.
 Đorđe Balašević, a prominent Serbian songwriter and singer. He was born in 1953 in Novi Sad.
 Jovan Đorđević (1826–1900), theatrical and public worker. He lived in Novi Sad.
 Jakov Jaša Ignjatović (1822–1889), a literate. He lived in Novi Sad.
 Đura Jakšić (1831–1878), a Serb poet, painter, narrator, play writer, bohemian, and patriot. He was born in Srpska Crnja.
 Jovan Jovanović Zmaj (1833–1904), one of the best-known Serb poets. He was born in Novi Sad.
 Paja Jovanović (1859–1957), one of the greatest Serbian realist painters. He was born in Vršac.
 Uroš Knežević (1811–1876), a Serb painter who was crucial in establishing the foundation of art in Serbia. He was born in Sremski Karlovci.
 Milan Konjović (1898–1993), a Serb painter. He was born in Sombor.
 Laza Kostić (1841–1910), a Serb literate. He was born in village Kovilj near Novi Sad, and he lived in Novi Sad.
 Mileva Marić (1875–1948), a Serb mathematician, and Albert Einstein's first wife. She was born in Titel.
 Lukijan Mušicki (1777–1837), a poet. He was born in Temerin.
 Tihomir Novakov (1929–Present), a Serb physicist. He was born and grew up in Sombor.
 Dositej Obradović (1742–1811), a Serb author, writer and translator. He was born in the village Čakovo in Banat (today Ciacova, in Romania).
 Zaharija Orfelin (1726–1785), writer. He was born in Vukovar or Petrovaradin, and he lived and died in Novi Sad. In 1768, he started the oldest Yugoslav magazine: "Slaveno-serbski magazin".
 Jovan Pačić (1771–1849), poet and officer. He was born in Baja and he lived in Novi Sad.
 Jovan Sterija Popović (1806–1856), a Serb literate, the first Serb comediographer, and a founder of the Serb drama. He was born in Vršac.
 Uroš Predić (1857–1953), a painter. He was born in village Orlovat in Zrenjanin municipality and he lived in Novi Sad.
 Michael I. Pupin (1854–1935), Serb and American physicist. He was born in the village Idvor in Banat.
 Branko Radičević, one of the best Serb poets of 19th century romanticism. He was born in 1824 in Slavonski Brod (today in Croatia), but he spent most of his life in Sremski Karlovci.
 Jovan Rajić (1726–1801), writer and historian. He was born in Sremski Karlovci.
 Željko Rebrača, a professional basketball player in the NBA. He was born in 1972 in village Prigrevica near Apatin.
 Josif Runjanin (1821–1878), a Serb composer and lieutenant-colonel in the Austro-Hungarian Army. He was born in Vinkovci in Srem (today in Croatia) and died in Novi Sad.
 Isidora Sekulić (1877–1958), a literate. She was born in village Mošorin in Titel municipality.
 Stevan Sremac (1855–1906), writer. He was born in Senta.
 Stanoje Stanojević (1874–1937), Serbian historian, university professor, academic and a leader of many scientific and publishing enterprises. He was born in Novi Sad.
 Milica Stojadinović Srpkinja (1830–1878), a literate. She was born in village Bukovac in Novi Sad municipality.
 Momčilo Tapavica (1872–1949), the first Serb that won an Olympic medal. Born in Nadalj near Srbobran.
 Aleksandar Tišma (1924–2003), a literate. He was born in village Horgoš near Kanjiža.
 Kosta Trifković (1843–1875), was a Serb writer, one of the best comediographs of the time. He was born in Novi Sad.

See also
 Serbs
 Vojvodina
 History of Vojvodina
 Demographic history of Vojvodina
 Declaratory Rescript of the Illyrian Nation

Sources
 
 
 
 
 
 
 
 
 

 Milan Tutorov, Mala Raška a u Banatu, Zrenjanin, 1991.
 Drago Njegovan, Prisajedinjenje Vojvodine Srbiji, Novi Sad, 2004.
 Radmilo Petrović, Vojvodina, Beograd, 2003.
 Dragomir Jankov, Vojvodina – propadanje jednog regiona, Novi Sad, 2004.
 Dejan Mikavica, Srpska Vojvodina u Habsburškoj Monarhiji 1690–1920, Novi Sad, 2005.
 Branislav Bukurov, Bačka, Banat i Srem, Novi Sad, 1978.
 Miodrag Milin, Vekovima zajedno, Temišvar, 1995.

Further reading

References

External links

 Folklore of Serbs in Vojvodina, by Vesna Bajić 
 National costumes of Serbs in Bačka
 National costumes of Serbs in Banat
 National costumes of Serbs in Srem

Ethnic groups in Vojvodina